Lommel is a municipality in Belgium.

Lommel may also refer to:

 Eugen von Lommel (1837-1899), German physicist
Lommel function, a physics function introduced by Eugen von Lommel
Lommel polynomial, a polynomial introduced by Eugen von Lommel
 Léon Lommel (1893-1978), Luxembourgian prelate of the Roman Catholic Church
 Pim van Lommel (born 1943), Dutch cardiologist and scientist
 Ulli Lommel (1944–2017), German actor and director
 K.F.C. Lommel S.K., Belgian association football club (1932–2003)
 Lommel S.K., Belgian association football club (with 2003)